Arnold M. Vickers (August 8, 1908 – December 25, 1967)   was the Democratic President of the West Virginia Senate from Fayette County and served from 1945 to 1949.

References 

1908 births
1967 deaths
People from Fayette County, West Virginia
West Virginia state senators
Presidents of the West Virginia State Senate
20th-century American politicians